Ordnance QF 3 inch howitzer was a howitzer fitted to British cruiser and infantry type tanks of the Second World War so they could fire a smoke shell in "close support" of other tanks or infantry. HE shells were also available.

Earlier British tanks were fitted with a 3.7 in howitzer.

Use
The doctrine covering the CS tanks was to "smoke parts of the enemy force" and so isolate them from the battle so the gun tanks could deal with the remainder with a local, if temporary, numerical advantage

While on most tanks the howitzer replaced the turret armament, on the early marks of the Churchill tank, the howitzer was fitted in the front of the hull which, although it allowed the tank to retain its main gun, limited the range and arc of fire.

Usage
 Matilda II Mark III CS, equipped at the HQ level, & by the Australians in the South Pacific
 Churchill tank Mk I - mounted low in the front hull - with associated narrowed arc of fire - as supplement to its turret mounted 2-pdr gun. A few Churchill Mk IICS were produced with the howitzer in the turret and the 2pdr in hull.
 Valentine tank Mk IIICS - a few produced in New Zealand by taking the howitzer from Matilda II Mk IVCS tanks
 Covenanter tanks - a few of various marks were fitted with the howitzer.
 Crusader Mk I CS and Mk II CS versions were equipped< (65 rounds)

A few Close Support versions of the Tetrarch light tank.

A field artillery version seems to have been developed or under development in 1941

Later in the war a larger QF 95 mm howitzer was employed for the same purpose.

Specification
 Calibre: 
 Length of barrel ("tube"):  (25 calibres)
 Overall length: 
 Weight: 
 Muzzle velocity: 
 Ammunition
 Cartridge:  76.2x134R
 Smoke:  shot weight
 HE:  shot weight 
 Range

Notes

References

 
 .

External links

 https://web.archive.org/web/20081013131302/http://www.wwiitanks.co.uk/tankdata/1940-Britain-Matilda-InfTankMkIIMatildaIIICS.html

World War II artillery of the United Kingdom
World War II tank guns
76 mm artillery
Tank guns of the United Kingdom